Conus dusaveli, common name Du Savel's cone, is a species of sea snail, a marine gastropod mollusk in the family Conidae, the cone snails and their allies.

Like all species within the genus Conus, these snails are predatory and venomous. They are capable of "stinging" humans, therefore live ones should be handled carefully or not at all.

Description
The size of the shell varies between 50 mm and 93 mm. The thin shell is striated throughout. Its color is yellowish or violaceous white. It is clouded.with chestnut, with distant revolving series of chestnut spots and short lines, most conspicuous on two irregular lighter bands.

Distribution
This marine species occurs off the Ryukyus, Japan and the Philippines.

Gallery

References

 Adams, H. 1872. Descriptions of fourteen new species of land and marine shells. Proceedings of the Zoological Society of London 1872:12–15, pl. 3.
 Shikama T. (1977). Descriptions of new and noteworthy Gastropoda from western Pacific and Indian Oceans. Science Reports of the Yokohama National University, section II (Geology). 24: 1-23, 5 pls.
 Filmer R.M. (2001). A Catalogue of Nomenclature and Taxonomy in the Living Conidae 1758 – 1998. Backhuys Publishers, Leiden. 388pp.
 Liu, J.Y. [Ruiyu] (ed.). (2008). Checklist of marine biota of China seas. China Science Press. 1267 pp.
 Tucker J.K. (2009). Recent cone species database. September 4, 2009 Edition
 Tucker J.K. & Tenorio M.J. (2009) Systematic classification of Recent and fossil conoidean gastropods. Hackenheim: Conchbooks. 296 pp.

External links
 The Conus Biodiversity website
 Cone Shells – Knights of the Sea
 

dusaveli
Gastropods described in 1872